The Banija villages killings was the mass murder of Croatian Serbs by Croatian forces on 22 August 1991 in several villages of the Banija region.

Background
In the spring of 1991 the armed conflict in Croatia began and several villages near Sisak, including Blinjski Kut and Kinjačka, were soon occupied by Serbian paramilitary forces. According to the Croatian Government, on 22 August 1991 Croatian forces carried out a military operation codenamed "Night Guard", in which they attempted to regain control from Serbian forces over several villages in the Sisak area, including Blinjski Kut.

Killings
On 22 August 1991, Croatian forces carried out military action on majority Serb villages of Blinjski Kut, Kinjačka Gornja, Kinjačka Donja, Blinjska Greda, Bestrma, Trnjane, Čakala and Brdjane, in which 15 people were killed. Most of the casualties were civilians, but some clashed with Croatian forces, as evidenced by the deaths of five soldiers.

References

1991 in Croatia
Mass murder in 1991
Croatian war crimes in the Croatian War of Independence
Massacres in Croatia
Massacres of Serbs
History of the Serbs of Croatia
August 1991 events in Europe
Massacres in the Croatian War of Independence